WABA NBL for season 2006–07 was the sixth season of WABA League. The study included twelve teams from five countries, a champion for the first time in team history became CSKA Sofia.  In this season participating clubs from Serbia, Montenegro, Bosnia and Herzegovina, Croatia,  Slovenia and from Bulgaria.

Team information

Regular season
The League of the season was played with 12 teams and play a dual circuit system, each with each one game at home and away. The four best teams at the end of the regular season were placed in the Final Four.

Final four
Final Four to be played 17 and 18 March 2007 in the Universiada Hall in Sofia, Bulgaria.

Awards
Player of the Year: Latasha Byears (184-F-73) of CSKA Sofia 
Guard of the Year: Sandra Popović (177-G-77) of Šibenik Jolly 
Forward of the Year: Latasha Byears (184-F-73) of CSKA Sofia 
Center of the Year: Tihana Abrlić (194-C-76) of Šibenik Jolly 
Import Player of the Year: Latasha Byears (184-F-73) of CSKA Sofia 
European Player of the Year: Sandra Popović (177-G-77) of Šibenik Jolly 
Coach of the Year: Georgi Bojkov of CSKA Sofia 

1st Team
Latasha Byears (184-F-73) of CSKA Sofia 
Sandra Popović (177-G-77) of Šibenik Jolly 
Anđa Jelavić (174-G-80) of Šibenik Jolly 
Vita Kuktiene (187-F-80) of Gospić Croatia Osiguranje 
Dragana Zorić (178-F-78) of Željezničar Sarajevo 

2nd Team
Ana Dabović (183-G/F-89) of Herceg Novi 
Tiffani Johnson (193-C-75) of CSKA Sofia 
Tihana Abrlić (194-C-76) of Šibenik Jolly 
Marina Ristić (168-G-87) of Željezničar Sarajevo 
Maja Erkič (182-G/F-85) of Merkur Celje 

Honorable Mention
Luca Ivanković (200-C-87) of Šibenik Jolly 
Olga Masilionene (181-F-80) of Gospić Croatia Osiguranje 
Diana Naydenova (171-G-73) of Gospić Croatia Osiguranje 
Lucie Conkova (186-F-83) of Merkur Celje 
Iva Perovanović (190-C/F-83) of Budućnost Podgorica 
Jasmina Bigović (176-G-79) of Jedinstvo Bijelo Polje 
Tina Periša (170-G-84) of Ragusa Dubrovnik 
Ivana Todorović (187-C-73) of Herceg Novi 
Ivana Grubor (185-F/C-84) of Vojvodina NIS 
Jelena Velinović (193-C-81) of Crvena zvezda 

All-Europeans Team
Sandra Popović (177-G-77) of Šibenik Jolly 
Anđa Jelavić (174-G-80) of Šibenik Jolly 
Vita Kuktiene (187-F-80) of Gospić Croatia Osiguranje 
Tihana Abrlić (194-C-76) of Šibenik Jolly 
Dragana Zorić (178-F-78) of Željezničar Sarajevo

References

External links
 2006–07 WABA NBL at eurobasket.com

2006-07
2006–07 in European women's basketball leagues
2006–07 in Serbian basketball
2006–07 in Bosnia and Herzegovina basketball
2006–07 in Slovenian basketball
2006–07 in Montenegrin basketball
2006–07 in Croatian basketball
2006–07 in Bulgarian basketball